Delrick Abrams Jr. (born April 6, 1997) is an American football cornerback for the Memphis Showboats of the United States Football League (USFL). He was signed by the Falcons as an undrafted free agent in 2020 following his college football career with the Colorado Buffaloes.

Professional career
Abrams signed with the Atlanta Falcons as an undrafted free agent following the 2020 NFL Draft on April 27, 2020. He was waived during final roster cuts on September 5, and signed to the team's practice squad the next day.  He was elevated to the active roster on September 26 for the team's week 3 game against the Chicago Bears, and reverted to the practice squad after the game. He made his NFL debut in the game, playing one snap on defense and 10 snaps on special teams. He was elevated again on October 5 and December 19 for the weeks 4 and 15 games against the Green Bay Packers and Tampa Bay Buccaneers, and reverted to the practice squad again following each game. He signed a reserve/future contract on January 4, 2021.

On August 31, 2021, Abrams was waived by the Falcons.

On December 18, 2021, Abrams was signed to the Los Angeles Rams practice squad, but was released three days later.

Abrams was selected with the first pick of the eighth round of the 2022 USFL Draft by the Tampa Bay Bandits.

Abrams and all other Tampa Bay Bandits players were all transferred to the Memphis Showboats after it was announced that the Bandits were taking a hiatus and that the Showboats were joining the league.

Personal life
Abrams appeared on the third season of the Netflix documentary series Last Chance U while attending Independence Community College in 2017.

References

External links
Atlanta Falcons bio
Colorado Buffaloes football bio

1997 births
Living people
People from Washington Parish, Louisiana
Players of American football from Louisiana
American football cornerbacks
Colorado Buffaloes football players
Atlanta Falcons players
Independence Pirates football players
Tampa Bay Bandits (2022) players